"(Closest Thing To) Perfect" is a song recorded by American R&B singer Jermaine Jackson. It was released as a single to the soundtrack from the 1985 film, Perfect. A music video was filmed featuring Jamie Lee Curtis as an aerobics instructor and John Travolta.

Charts

References

External links
Genius: (Closest Thing To) Perfect - Lyrics

1985 singles
Jermaine Jackson songs
1985 songs
Songs written by Bruce Sudano
Songs written by Michael Omartian
Songs written by Jermaine Jackson
Arista Records singles
Song recordings produced by Michael Omartian